Greece and Serbia enjoy close diplomatic relations, which have traditionally been friendly due to cultural, religious and historical ties between the two nations.

The majority of Serbs and Greeks practice the Eastern Orthodox faith and the two nations were historically bound by alliance treaties and co-belligerence in wars since the Middle Ages. In modern history, the revolutions against the Ottoman Empire, the Balkan Wars, the World Wars and the Yugoslav wars also have contributed to these relations. Greece opposed the NATO bombing of FR Yugoslavia, being the only NATO member to condemn the actions and to openly express its disapproval. Polls revealed that 94% of the Greek population were completely opposed to the bombing. Greece's subsequently refused to recognize the unilateral declaration of independence of Kosovo, backing the Serbian stance on this issue as one of the five European Union's member states that have done so. 

Greece is a strong supporter of the EU membership candidacy for Serbia, and in 2003 it has proposed the "Agenda 2014" for boosting the Euro-Atlantic integration of all the remaining former Yugoslav states and Albania into the Union. The two countries cooperate in security, tourism, culture and agriculture, with Greece being the third top investor from the EU to Serbia and the fifth overall (as of 2013).

Cultural ties
Greece and Serbia both share a similar Byzantine heritage, as both were a part of the Eastern Roman Empire. Both nations are Eastern Orthodox Christian. Acknowledging this cultural heritage, former vice-president of Republika Srpska, Dragan Dragic, stated that Serbs' roots stem from Hellenic civilization and that the two peoples are united through Orthodoxy. Some Greek politicians have, likewise, expressed these sentiments. Secretary General for European Affairs Dimitrios K. Katsoudas, in an address regarding Serbia, stated that "Greece and Serbia are two countries linked by ancient and inextricable bonds. Our relationship is lost in the depths of time. Serbian culture and religion were greatly influenced by our common roots in the great civilization of Byzantium."

History

Middle Ages

During the Early Middle Ages, Principality of Serbia was a subject of the Byzantine Empire. The ethnogenesis of Serbs began in the Byzantine-Slavic environment, part of the wider Byzantine commonwealth. In the 11th and 12th centuries, the Serbs began fighting for independence, revolting against the Byzantines. In the following centuries, Serbia's independence was recognized by the Byzantines, and the two were mostly in friendly relations. The Serbs aided the Byzantines at the Battle of Sirmium (1167) and Battle of Gallipoli (1312). Most of the Serbian queen consorts were Byzantine women (such as Eudokia Angelina, Simonida, Maria Palaiologina, Irene Kantakouzene, Helena Palaiologina). Manuel I of Constantinople recognized Sava as the first Archbishop of the Serbs. Hilandar on Mount Athos became one of the most important cultural and religious centres of the Serbian people. Some Byzantine families found refuge in Serbia at the end of the 14th and early 15th century, following Ottoman conquests, such as the Angeloi and Kantakouzenos; notable statesmen in the Serbian Despotate of Greek origin include Janja Kantakouzenos, Dimitrije Kantakuzin and Mihailo Anđelović. The two last Byzantine Emperors were of Serbian maternal descent.

The Serbs were greatly influenced by the Hellenic culture of the Byzantine Empire, particularly under the reign of Serbian emperor Stefan Dušan. Dušan, who had himself crowned as "Emperor of Serbs and Greeks," made both Serbian and Greek the official languages of his empire, wrote charters and signed in Greek, and adopted Eastern Roman law as the foundations of his empire. He sought to synthesize the Byzantine Empire into a Serbian-Greek empire. Dušan, therefore, "took pains to woo the Greek inhabitants of those provinces [that he had acquired in Macedonia and northern Greece]. His code of law, or Zakonik, proclaimed the equality of Serbs and Greeks in all his dominions and confirmed the privileges bestowed on Greek cities by Byzantine Emperors of the past whom Dušan was pleased to regard as his imperial predecessors. His administrators were adorned with the Byzantine titles of Despot, Caesar and sebastokrator and his court was a model of that in Constantinople. He minted a silver coinage in the Byzantine style; and churches and monasteries in the Slav as well as the Greek provinces of his empire were decorated by artists of the best Byzantine school."

19th century
During the First Serbian Uprising (1804–15), the Serbian rebels were joined by Greeks and Greek-Aromanians, among others, with notable examples being fighter Giorgakis Olympios, diplomat Petar Ičko, secretary Naum Krnar, fighter Konda Bimbaša, and others. Greek armatolos Nikotsaras (d. 1807) planned to cross Mount Olympos to join the Serbian rebels. Military cooperation between the two nations was forged in the semi-autonomous Danubian Principalities, which were governed mostly by Phanariote Greek voivodes. There are indications that communication and cooperation between Serbs and Greeks of the Greek mainland had also been established early. For example, in 1806 the French consul in Thessaloniki reported that "the Turks are very furious against the Greeks because of their communications with the Serbs". It was reported that many Slav and Greek peasants were arrested suspected of aiding the Serbian rebels. The klephts and armatoloi were encouraged by the Serbian rebels and Russian actions. The Serbian rebels were important allies to the Greeks; after the suppression of the First Uprising, Karađorđe fled to Bessarabia, where he joined the Greek national liberation movement Filiki Eteria, becoming an active member. The Greeks were primarily interested in using the Serbian lands as base of the Greek operations. Miloš Obrenović, the leader of the Second Serbian Uprising (1815–17) was fully uncooperative. The first historian of the Serbian Revolution was a Greek, Triantafillos Doukas. Many Serbs joined the Greek War of Independence (1821–29), such as Hadži-Prodan and Vasos Mavrovouniotis.

Dimitrios Karatasos sought to establish a Greek-Serbian alliance in 1861, traveling to Belgrade, but died during his trip. Lambros Koutsonikas, a Greek veteran and historian, dreamt of a Greek–Serbian federation of "two sisters" (1863).

The Treaty of Vöslau, signed between Greece and Serbia on 26 August 1867, bound the two countries in an alliance.

Balkan Wars

In the First Balkan War of 1912–1913, Greece, Serbia, Montenegro and Bulgaria (Balkan League) defeated the Ottoman Empire and divided the former territories of European Turkey among themselves. The division of the geographical area of Macedonia became a major point of contention among the allies. Greece had captured Thessaloniki and much of western Macedonia, while Serbia had captured most of northern Macedonia, both areas also coveted by Bulgaria.

In June 1913 Serbia and Greece signed a defensive pact (Greek-Serbian Alliance of 1913) opposing to Bulgaria's expansionist goals. Eventually on 16 June of the same year Bulgaria attacked both countries, starting the Second Balkan War. Being decisively defeated by the Greeks in the Battle of Kilkis-Lahanas and by the Serbs in the battle of Bregalnica, Bulgaria retreated into defensive positions until Romania entered the war by attacking Bulgaria and threatening Sofia, resulting in the latter's defeat. Greece and Serbia found themselves being the winner parties by having successfully fought the war side by side.

World War I

Despite its defensive alliance with Serbia, Greece remained neutral in the early part of the First World War, due to the dissension between Prime Minister Eleftherios Venizelos, who was pro-Entente and favoured entering the war, and King Constantine I of Greece, who was pro-German and favoured neutrality. The resulting National Schism was resolved only in 1917, when Constantine was forcibly deposed by the Entente Powers and Greece entered the war under Venizelos.

Corfu served as a refuge for the Serbian army that retreated there by the Entente forces ships from the homeland occupied by the Austrians and Bulgarians. During their stay, a large portion of Serbian soldiers died from exhaustion, food shortage, and different diseases. Most of their remains were buried at sea near the island of Vido, a small island at the mouth of Corfu port, and a monument of thanks to the Greek Nation has been erected at Vido by the grateful Serbs; consequently, the waters around Vido island are known by the Serbian people as the Blue Graveyard (in Serbian, Плава Гробница), after a poem written by Milutin Bojić after World War I.

World War II

In 1941, during the Helleno-Italian War, when Hitler demanded passage around the Kingdom of Yugoslavia to attack Greece, the Regent Prince Pavle of Yugoslavia attempted to appease Hitler by offering a non-aggression pact but, ultimately, signed the Tripartite Pact that would allow German passage.  In return, the Greek city of Thessaloniki was promised to Yugoslavia.  Two days later the army, aided secretly by the UK and the USSR, overthrew the regime with the popular support of both the Serbian people.  Although it is arguable that this had more to do with the Serbs' anti-German sentiments rather than a love for Greece, the fact remains that the Serbian people still remembered Venizelos' response to Vienna's suggestion for Greece to attack and invade Serbia decades earlier: "Greece is too small a country to do such big malice". Despite the fact that the new Yugoslav government again tried to appease Hitler (given that the country was surrounded on three sides) with neutrality and promises of adhering to previous agreements, the Serbian people were enthusiastic in denouncing the Tripartite Pact and Serb crowds paraded the streets of Belgrade shouting slogans like "Better War than the Pact". Hitler was not pleased and, immediately following the coup had decided to invade Yugoslavia—no longer trusting their proclamations—and divide the Yugoslav territories of the Adriatic coast, Banat, and Macedonia between Italy, Hungary, and Bulgaria, respectively. After the fall of Yugoslavia, the Serbian people were punished with genocide by the pro-German Croatian Ustaše.

Yugoslav wars
In mid-1992, the UN responded to Serbian offensives in the former Yugoslav republic of Bosnia and Herzegovina by declaring a full embargo on trade with Serbia by all member nations. The sanctions placed Greece, which had recognized the independence of Bosnia and Herzegovina shortly after its declaration in 1992, in a difficult position. Serbia was an important trading partner with strong religious and historical ties to Greece, and Serbia had initially supported the Greek position on the Macedonia naming dispute. Beginning in 1992, the Konstantinos Mitsotakis and Andreas Papandreou governments, fearing that the Bosnian war would spread in a direction that would involve Turkey, Albania and Greece, undertook long series of peace-negotiations with Serbia's president, Slobodan Milošević, Bosnian Serb leader Radovan Karadžić, and the Bosnian government without results. Meanwhile, food, oil, and arms were reported moving from Greece into Serbia in violation of the UN embargo. Before, during, and after its 1994 presidency of the EU, Greece was the only EU nation to back the Serbian position that Serbian forces had entered Bosnian territory. In early 1994, Greece incurred the displeasure of its European allies by voting against NATO air strikes on Serbian positions. Greece also refused the use of its NATO air bases at Preveza on the Ionian Sea for such attacks and refused to supply Greek troops to the UN peacekeeping mission in Bosnia. In NATO, Greece's position was diametrically opposed to that of Turkey, which supported the Bosnian government.

In December 1994, after official talks with Milošević in Athens, Papandreou reiterated that the positions of Greece and Serbia on the Bosnia issue were virtually identical. A Milošević proposal for a confederation of Greece and Serbia with the Republic of Macedonia failed to gain support among any faction in Greece.

Assistance to Bosnian Serbs and Republika Srpska 
According to University of Amsterdam professor 'C. Wiebes', the Hellenic National Intelligence Service (EYP) systematically sabotaged NATO operations in Bosnia in the mid-1990s, in an attempt to aid Bosnian Serb nationalists. In his report for the Dutch government, entitled Intelligence en de oorlog in Bosnie 1992-1995, Wiebes claims that EYP leaked classified NATO military plans (to which, as an allied intelligence service, it had access) to the Serb Bosnian leadership, and often to General Ratko Mladić himself, during the summer of 1995. Eventually, Wiebes states in the report, NATO allies ceased sharing NATO military plans with the Greek authorities.

In August 2008, a group of lawyers from Chania, Crete, Greece, visited ICTY Indictee Radovan Karadžić and offered their services for free and have asked international organizations to ensure a just trial for the former Bosnian Serb President.

Srebrenica
According to Agence France Presse (AFP), a dozen Greek volunteers fought alongside the Serbs at Srebrenica. They were members of the Greek Volunteer Guard (ΕΕΦ), or GVG, a contingent of Greek paramilitaries formed at the request of Ratko Mladić as an integral part of the Drina Corps. Some had links with the Greek neo-Nazi organisation Golden Dawn, others were mercenaries. The Greek volunteers were motivated by the desire to support their "Orthodox brothers" in battle. They raised the Greek flag at Srebrenica after the fall of the town at Mladić's request, to honour "the brave Greeks fighting on our side." Radovan Karadžić subsequently decorated four of them."

In 2005 Greek deputy Andreas Andrianopoulos called for an investigation of the Greek volunteers' role at Srebrenica where the Srebrenica Massacre was carried out. The Greek Minister of Justice Anastasios Papaligouras commissioned an inquiry, which had still not reported as of July 2010.

NATO bombing of FR Yugoslavia
NATO bombing of the Federal Republic of Yugoslavia caused a strong popular reaction in Greece, Prime Minister Costas Simitis sought a political solution to the Kosovo conflict. Greece refused to participate in the strikes against FR Yugoslavia.

Several polls were conducted, one of which revealed that 99.5% of the Greek population were completely opposed to the bombing, with 85% believing NATO's motives were strategic and not humanitarian. Another revealed that 94% of Greek people opposed NATO and the war against Yugoslavia. 69% wanted U.S. President Bill Clinton tried for war crimes, while 52% opposed the admittance of Kosovo Albanian refugees to Greece.

20 prominent Greek judges of the supreme court (Council of State) signed a declaration, where they declared NATO guilty of war crimes. The more dramatic event was a People's Tribunal of over a 10.000 people in Athens, Greece, where the Greek Supreme Court declared President Clinton and NATO leaders guilty of war crimes.

During a C-SPAN discussion in 2005 with General Wesley Allen Clark, the commander of NATO during the Kosovo War and NATO bombings, it was reported that several Greek non-governmental organizations were sending relief supplies in the middle of the bombings, which caused the bombing of certain targets more difficult, the intention of the organizations was to forestall the military action by sending humanitarian aid to the Kosovo Serb enclaves.

Other factors

Greeks in Serbia

According to the 2002 census, there were 572 Serbian citizens of Greek ethnicity. Greek community associations in Serbia estimate a total of 4,500 Serbian citizens of Greek ethnic descent. The Greek Foreign Ministry asserts that marriages between Serbs and Greeks living in Serbia are quite common, and that this is both a cause and result of the close bonds shared by many Greeks and Serbs. In February 2008, the Greek minority living in Serbia turned to Greece to not recognize the unilateral secession in Kosovo by the Kosovo Albanians. They stated that the independence of Kosovo would endanger the stability in the Balkans and weaken the traditional Serbian-Greek relations.

Serbs in Greece

According to the 2001 census, 5,200 people Serbian-born people have Greek citizenship. It is estimated that more than 15,000 Serbs live in Greece. Prominent sportspeople with Greek citizenship include Peja Stojaković and Vlantimir Giankovits.

Humanitarianism
Following the outbreak of war in the Balkans, Serbs received tremendous humanitarian aid from Greece and Cyprus, as well as the Churches of Greece and Cyprus, beginning in the early 1990s.  This aid came from all sectors of Greek society: from the state, from the Church, from various organizations, and from the public.  The majority of the aid focused on helping Serbs from the Republika Srpska, the Republic of Serb Krajina, and Serbia proper who had suffered as a result of the wars that ravaged those areas.

Aid to Serbia
In late July 1995, it was announced that the Greek-Serbian Friendship Society would be distributing humanitarian aid in the form of rice to Serbia by mid-August.  According to the president of the organization, Panayiotis Mihalakakos, the total cost of the project exceeded 5 million drachmas and the Piraeus Port Authority had co-sponsored the initiative and provided necessary packaging and transportation of the cargo.

In March 1999 businessman Stavros Vitalis secured the participation of 250 Greeks to leave for Belgrade in order to offer any kind of help they could to the Serb people.  Among the 250 people were lawyers, doctors, and other professionals.  Stavros Vitalis was reported as saying that they were on the side of the Serbs because they regarded them as friends and brothers.

On 25 October 1999, Serbia's Minister of Health Leposava Milicevic received a delegation from the Greek-Serbian Friendship Society "Ancient Greece." The delegation was led by the organization's president Laios Constantinos. The meeting with the health minister produced a number of initiatives regarding humanitarian aid drives, health protection, and medical supplies.

In April 1999, the municipality of Kalamaria collected 50 tons of humanitarian aid consisting of food and medicines. The mission was headed by mayor of Kalamaria Christodoulos Economidis.  The Greek Ministry of Health issued a special permit that allowed blood donated by volunteers from the municipalities of Kalamaria, Pentalofos, and Florina, along with the monks of the Serbian monastery of Hilandariou in Mount Athos, to be included in the humanitarian drive. During that same month, representatives of the Athens-based Society of Greek-Serbian Friendship announced that they would be sending a 16-truck convoy of humanitarian aid consisting of food and medical supplies, and worth over 2 million German marks, to Serbia on 20 April. The friendship society's efforts were reported as ongoing, with continued collection drives and relief aid convoys leaving at regular 20-day intervals. The friendship society also informed the press that it had engaged lawyers to bring charges against NATO leaders before the Greek Bar and the Hague International Court for their aggression against Yugoslavia and the innocent civilian lives that had been lost as a direct result of the aggression.

On 7 May 2006, a charity dinner was organized by Lifeline Hellas Humanitarian Organization in Thessaloniki under the patronage of Crown Prince Alexander II and Crown Princess Katherine for the purpose of helping to reduce shortages of important equipment in hospitals by upgrading the Neonatal Intensive Care Units in Belgrade, Nis, Novi Sad, and Kragujevac and thereby saving the lives of newborn infants. This was the second event of its kind organized in 2006, following the successful charity dinner organized in late January in Athens.  Numerous companies and organizations, as well as eminent families and members of the business community of Thessaloniki, cooperated and supported the humanitarian event. Speeches were made by President of the Board of Directors of Lifeline Hellas Mr. John Trikardos, Crown Prince Alexander, Crown Princess Katherine, Minister of Macedonia-Thrace Mr. George Kalaitzis, General Consul of Serbia and Montenegro in Greece Mr. Radomir Zivkovic, Prefecture of Thessaloniki Mr. Panayiotis Psomiadis, Vice Mayor of Thessaloniki Mrs. Kolovou Lemonia (on behalf of the Mayor Mr. Papageorgopoulos), and President of the American College Anatolia Mr. Richard Jackson. Other distinguished guests included members of the Greek Parliament and former ministers and government officials of the Greek government.

Aid to Serbs in Bosnia
On 4 October 1995, it was announced that a "peace train" carrying 10,000 tons of humanitarian aid consisting of clothing, pharmaceuticals, and food would leave Greece on 26 October to aid Bosnian Serb refugees. This effort was organized by the "Macedonian-Thrace Coordination Committee for Aid to the Orthodox Serbs of Bosnia" and had been established at the initiative of the Balkan Strategy Development Institute and the Greek-Serbian Association.  The committee's members included prefectures, northern Greek cities, local municipalities, chambers, and public and private enterprises.

On 5 December 1995, 70 tons of humanitarian aid consisting of olive oil, flour, baby food, and medicine were sent to the Bosnian Serbs in the region of Prijedor by the municipality of Neapolis. The effort was headed by mayor of Neapolis Mr. Hadjisavas.

On 22 February 1996, 200 tons of humanitarian aid consisting of food, clothing, and medicine gathered by the Athens Association of Greek-Serb Friendship arrived in Republika Srpska.  The aid was accompanied by a delegation led by the association's chairman Mr. Konstantinos Christopoulos.

On 3 July 1997, humanitarian aid consisting of clothing and foodstuffs arrived in Doboi. The aid was accompanied by a 10-person delegation from the municipality of Peristeri in Athens, including mayor of Peristeri Giorgos Panopoulos. The delegation was welcomed by mayor of Doboi Drago Ljubitsic who stated that the friendly ties between the Greeks and the Serbs would last forever and that no one will be able to interrupt them.

Miscellaneous aid
During the 1990s an initiative for Greek families to host Serbian children—especially those who were refugees, orphans, had lost family members during the wars, or came from poor families—was established in order to help children forget their hardships for a while and overcome psychological problems caused by the traumatic experiences they had lived through. In 1999, a Greek delegation of the Greek-Serbian Friendship Society "Ancient Greece," after meeting with Serbian Minister of Health Leposava Milicevic, was reported as having launched such a program. However, reports of Serbian children being hosted in Greece precede this initiative by several years. Cooperation between the Greek Red Cross and the Serbian Red Cross for the hosting of Serbian children is said to have been established in 1993.

One of the earliest hostings of Serbian children recorded in the media dates to late 1995 when 50 Bosnian Serb children from Zvornik spent Christmas and New Year's with Greek families.  Another 50 Bosnian Serb children from the same town arrived in Thessaloniki on 10 January 1996 for a two-week vacation with families in Kavala and Imathia. In July 1998, a total of 540 orphans and children of refugees from Republika Srpska and Serbia left for Greece and were hosted over the summer by various municipalities and communities in the country. It was the fourth hosting mission that had been organized by the Central Union of Municipalities and Communities of Greece in cooperation with the Red Cross that year. In total, the Central Union of Municipalities and Communities of Greece had been responsible for hosting more than 2,000 Serbian children by that point.  Greek Ambassador to Belgrade Panayiotis Vlassopoulos stated that hospitality for these children in Greece constituted only a portion of the humanitarian aid which Greek local governments and organizations have been providing for Yugoslavia since war erupted. He added that these initiatives contribute to the strengthening of Greek–Serbian relations. In 1999, the Yugoslav Red Cross and a Greek-Serb friendship society organized the hosting of children between the ages of 8 and 12 by families in Kavala for a nine-month period. The children were accompanied by their teachers so that they'd be able to keep up with their studies. The mayor of Kavala, Stathis Efifillidis, was quoted as saying that, "All the residents of the city have shown their love for the children."

The hosting of Serbian children did not end in the 1990s and is still ongoing in the 2000s.  In 2002, Greek families hosted Serbian orphans from 20 December 2002 to 6 January 2003. Greek families again hosted orphan Serbian children in the summer of 2003, from 10 July to 10 August.  The hospitality program, like many others, was held with the cooperation of the Greek Red Cross and the Yugoslav Red Cross. In 2006, a total of 216 children of refugees, children who lost a parent in the war, and children from poor families spent Christmas in Greece within the framework of the hospitality programme for Serb children held by the Serbian and the Greek Red Cross.  It was the second time that year that Serbian children were hosted.  Since the Greek and Serbian Red Cross launched the hosting of children from Serbia in 1993, an estimated 16,000 children have stayed with Greek families.  As a result, very close friendship ties have been forged and, in most cases, contact between the children and the host families continues.

The Orthodox Churches of Greece and Cyprus have also been a great source of humanitarian aid to the Serbs.  When, in September 1996, Patriarch Pavle of the Serbian Orthodox Church visited Cyprus, he presented Archbishop Chrysostomos of the Church of Cyprus with an icon of the Virgin Mary as a token of appreciation for the help and support the Church of Cyprus and the people of Cyprus had shown to the people of Serbia. Archbishop Chrysostomos praised the close relations between the Churches of Serbia and Cyprus, remarking that the presence of Patriarch Pavle was proof of the unity and brotherhood between the two Churches. Patriarch Pavle compared the situations that Greeks in Cyprus face to those that Serbs face, saying that both Cyprus and Serbia were struggling for their freedom. He also reaffirmed Serbian support to the Greeks of Cyprus. During his official visit to Serbia in September 2001, Archbishop Christodoulos announced that the Church of Greece would be donating 150 million drachmas for the mission of the Serbian Orthodox Church and another 100 million drachmas for the construction of the church of Saint Savvas. In an address at Belgrade's Cathedral, Archbishop Christodoulos referred to the help which the Greeks had offered to the Serbs. For all of his activities and assistance to the Serbian Orthodox Church and the Serbian people, Patriarch Pavle conferred the medal of Saint Sava of the First Order to Archbishop Christodoulos.  At the ceremony Patriarch Pavle was quoted as saying that, "The Greek Church has always sympathised with the troubles we have been in, rendering us support as well as aid in medicines and food". Likewise, Yugoslav President Vojislav Kostunica awarded Archbishop Christodoulos the highest medal of the Yugoslav Federation for the help of the Greek Church towards the Serbian people during the last decade. The Greek Orthodox Archdiocese of America also supplied humanitarian assistance to Serbs.  In 2004, Hellenic College and Holy Cross Greek Orthodox School of Theology (HC/HC) raised over five thousand dollars to assist in the rebuilding of the Orthodox Seminary of Saints Cyril and Methodius in Kosovo after the seminary was burnt by Albanians.  During the first days of Holy Week, the Rev. Protopresbyter Nicholas Triantafilou, President of HC/HC, announced that offerings collected during the week would be designated for this cause as well as coordinating relief efforts. It is also worth noting that, following the catastrophic fire at Chilandar Monastery in Mount Athos, the Greek authorities coordinated the collection of donations and the rebuilding effort.  Most of the expected cost, estimated at over 30 million euros, will be provided by Greece.  By June 2004, the government had already disbursed 300,000 euros for the first phase of the work.

Serbian aid during 2007 and 2021 Greek forest fires

Following the Greek forest fires in 2007, Serbia sent six M-18 Dromader and one Antonov An-2 firefighting planes, 6 firefighting all-terrain vehicles, 55 firefighters, and put specialized military units on alert in case they were needed to assist the Greek Army battling fires and clearing out the debris. According to Assistant Minister of Interior Predrag Maric, over 300 firemen signed up for Greece in less than an hour.

On 7 September 2007, Defense Minister, Dragan Šutanovac and the Ambassador of Greece to Serbia, Christos Panagopoulos, welcomed the pilots and technicians of Jat Airways who assisted in extinguishing the fires in Greece, at the Lisičji Jarak Airport.

Šutanovac stated that Serbia had acted upon the request of the Greek Ministry of Defense, and he thanked Jat Airways and the representatives of the Serbian Ministry of Defense who, as he added, helped selflessly the brotherly nation of Greece.
Minister Šutanovac said that he was also interested why the planes of Jat had not been used for extinguishing fires in Serbia this summer, adding that the Ministry of Defense was not the bearer of this work.
The Ambassador of Greece said that that day showed once again the excellent cooperation between the two nations thanking everyone who had taken part in extinguishing fires.
He also remarked that in the last ten days, Serbian pilots and technicians showed great skill in extinguishing fires, which moved the whole of Greece and the Greek nation in particular.
"I am here to convey Greek President and Government's warmest regards. We shall never forget your brotherly act", the Ambassador of Greece to Serbia Christos Panagopoulos said.

On the initiative of Crown Prince Alexander II and Crown Princess Katherine an important charity event in aid of victims of the tragic Greek fires, took place on 24 September 2007 at the Ekali Club in Athens, in cooperation with the Hellenic Basketball Club Association (ESAKE), Lifeline Hellas and with the support of Vlade Divac, distinguished NBA player. Famous basketball players were present to support this humanitarian event. Among many the event was attended by: Vlade Divac, Predrag Danilovic, Zarkο Paspalj, Dusan Ivkovic, Wayne Cooper, Scott Pollard, Grant Napiere, Chris Webber, Glen Rice.

Crown Prince Alexander II and Crown Princess Katherine continued their noble efforts on 29 September 2007, when they visited the Messinia region and the municipality of Andania to deliver Serbian donations of clothes for children as well as baby equipment to the victims of the forest fires in Greece.

In August 2021 Serbia sent a special unit consisting of 37 firefighters and 3 helicopters to assist Greece in fighting against wildfire rampage.

Bilateral relations
Serbian-Greek relations have traditionally been friendly due to cultural and historical factors. Friendly relations have played an important role in bilateral relations between the two nations, especially during the wars of the 1990s and the Balkans Campaign in World War I.

Greece is the top investor in Serbian economy and during the NATO bombing of Yugoslavia, Greece openly expressed its disapproval and polls revealed that 94% of the Greek population were completely opposed to the bombing.

State

Following the dissolution of the state union of Serbia and Montenegro, Serbia inherited the rights and obligations of the union and, as a result, the existing bilateral contractual framework with Greece. Out of the many Greek-Serbian bilateral agreements, it is worth pointing out the agreements on mutual judicial relations, scientific and educational cooperation, tourism development, air transport, international road transportation of passengers and goods, and economic and technological cooperation.

There are regular high-level visits between the two countries, such as Foreign Minister Ms. Dora Bakoyannis the recent visit to Belgrade (20 April 2007), on which she was accompanied by Deputy Foreign Minister Mr. Euripides Stylianidis, and the recent official visit to Athens of Serbia's Foreign Minister, Mr. Vuk Jeremić. There are also frequent contacts between the two countries ministries and agencies on various matters concerning individual sectors.

Greece is one of Serbia's main EU trade partners. Bilateral trade has increased significantly over the past few years. According to the data of the Bureau of Economic and Trade Matters of Greece's Embassy in Belgrade, Greek direct investments in Serbia (from 1996 onwards) amount to $1.2 billion. There are investments in all sectors, but mainly in the industrial and banking sectors. It is worth noting the presence of 150 Greek-Serbian companies, as well as 120 purely Greek businesses that employ 25,000 jobs.

Serbia has an embassy in Athens and a consulate-general in Thessaloniki while Greece has an embassy in Belgrade, consulate-general in Niš and liaison-office in Pristina. Serbia also maintains honorary consulate and a memorial museum in Corfu.

Police and military cooperation (defense)
On 20 October, Interior ministers of Serbia and Greece, Ivica Dacic and Prokopis Pavlopoulos signed an agreement on police cooperation between their two countries in Athens that paves the way for intelligence sharing for all crime forms, illegal migration, narcotics trade and human trafficking.

The defense ministers of Serbia and Greece, Dragan Sutanovac and Evangelos Meimarakis met in Belgrade on 26 February 2009 discussing the sharing view of a stable Balkans based on mutual trust and cooperation and the huge possibilities to boost the military cooperation between the two countries. Greece still supports Serbia in the Kosovo question.

Greek position on Serbia in EU

In June 2008 Greece's ambassador to Serbia Christos Panagopoulos said Greece consistently backs Serbia's development and wants it to assume its place in the EU. He stated that political leadership of Greece wish is for Serbia to take its place in the European family and that Greece believes that is the best for Serbia and for regional stability. According to Panagopoulos, Greece is conducting a policy of support to Serbia's development and improving the lives of its citizens, as reflected in the large aid that Serbia received after 2000, as well as investments that exceed 2.5 billion EUR. He recalled that in 2001 and 2002 the serious situation in the country dictated that aid was predominantly of a humanitarian character, but that this was followed by development aid. Greece adopted an important aid program, dubbed the "Hellenic Plan for the Economic Reconstruction of the Balkans", which earmarked 230 million EUR for Serbia. The bulk of this sum, about 80 percent, was intended for infrastructure, including Corridor X, which was a priority both for Serbia and Greece. Of the overall costs of construction of Corridor 10, amounting to about 300 million EUR, 100 million will constitute a net donation from the Greek government. He underlined that one of Athens and its Belgrade-based embassy's goals was the promotion of economic relations, which had a very positive dynamism, since Greece topped the list of countries making direct and indirect investment in Serbia. He said that Greece is present in all strategic branches of the economy, meaning that Greek investors came to Serbia to stay and that Greek investment will create more than 27,000 jobs for Serbian citizens. Panagopoulos expressed his hope that this trend would shortly be expanded with Serbian investment in Greece.

On 19 October 2008, The Greek Foreign Minister, Dora Bakoyannis, said that Greeks and Serbs have a special relationship and that Serbia is coming closer to the European Union, making important steps on the way and that she believed Serbia had much to offer for the EU.

Greek Foreign Minister Dimitris Droutsas met with Serbian counterpart Vuk Jeremić on 22 May, they said that relations between the two countries are excellent, they further discussed Western Balkans in the European Union, Greece said the region would join the EU by 2014. Jeremić thanked Greece's position on Kosovo, the economic cooperation and overall excellent relations. Greece is Serbia's top important partner in Southeastern Europe. Greece helped with the visa liberalization, and Jeremić said: "This year, our citizens will be able to travel to the Greek sea much easier. They will spend their vacations in Greece, because there is no seacoast in the region where our citizens can feel better than in Greece...." Droutsas said Greece is ready to ratify Serbia's Stabilization and Association Agreement (SAA) immediately.

Economy

Greece is the third overall top investor from the EU to Serbia and was the top investor in Serbian economy in 2008. In 2013, Greece invested $1.66bn.

Sister cities
Some of the sister cities between Serbia and Greece:

 Belgrade - Athens
 Niš - Cassandreia; Sparta; Glyfada; Maroussi; Alimos
 Novi Sad - Ilioupoli
 Smederevo - Volos
 Kruševac - Corfu
 Jagodina - Corinth
 Aleksinac - Lavrio; Patras; Eana; Lavris; Sampolitio; Veronas
 Čačak - Katerini; Filippoi
 Grocka - Agia Paraskevi
 Kragujevac - Drama
 Pančevo - Neapoli
 Šabac - Argostoli
 Paraćin - Eleftherio-Kordelio; Perdika

Church relations
The Greek Orthodox Church has had excellent relations with the Serbian Orthodox Church, including acquiring and giving humanitarian aid to Serbia during all of the wars. These relations have extended also to the Serbian state. Regarding the latter, the Church of Greece has supported "Serbian positions even on the matter of the secession of Montenegro from the Federation." as well as supporting Serbia on Kosovo, and likewise, the Serbian Church has supported the Greek position on Cyprus. Like the other Orthodox churches, the Church of Greece does not recognize the self-declared autocephaly of the Macedonian Orthodox Church and considers it part of Serbian Church.

In 1994, the Greek Orthodox Church declared Radovan Karadžić as "one of the most prominent sons of our Lord Jesus Christ working for peace" and decorated him with the nine-hundred-year-old Knights' Order of the First Rank of Saint Dionysius of Xanthe. Ecumenical Patriarch Bartholomew announced that "the Serbian people have been chosen by God to protect the western frontiers of Orthodoxy".

Confederation plan from 1992

Despite strained ties during Josip Broz Tito's rule of Yugoslavia, Serbian-Greek relations reached the point where the creation of a state for Serbs and Greeks was seriously proposed by Slobodan Milošević in 1992. According to the proposal Greece, Serbia, and North Macedonia would all be members of the tripartite confederation. In 1994, Milošević invited Greek Prime Minister Andreas Papandreou to consider the longstanding proposal of the Athens-Belgrade-Skopje confederation. Papandreou characterized the idea as "a pioneering, interesting proposal" but noted that it had not yet been examined. Main opposition New Democracy party leader Miltiadis Evert, who had also met with Milošević, said that all Balkan countries should instead gain accession to the European Union. Political Spring party leader Antonis Samaras said that the proposal was "interesting but should be thoroughly examined." These proposals failed to gain any significant response from the Greek government, mostly because of the precarious state of Yugoslavia at the time.

The position of the Republic of Macedonia regarding the tripartite confederation was widely supported by politicians and intellectuals. Immediately following Milošević's renewed call for a loose confederation between Greece, Serbia, and the Republic of Macedonia, Socialist Party of Macedonia president Kiro Popovski deemed the longstanding proposal as a "present utopia but a feasible future prospect." In 2001, former president of the Republic of Macedonia Kiro Gligorov noted the wide support for the proposal amongst ethnic Macedonian intellectuals: "This begun when Yugoslavia was beginning to fall apart, when intellectuals and politicians gathered in order to examine the perspectives that we had for our country. Our common position was that a confederation with Greece was the best solution." Macedonian novelist Ante Popovski in an interview with the French newspaper Libération on 27 March 2001 stated, "I am supporting the idea of a confederation with Greece. We shall not be in danger of losing our identity, because our language is entirely different from the Greek one, while it resembles with the languages of the two other large neighbors, the Serbs and the Bulgarians."

Transportation
Transportation between Serbia and Greece is well developed due to Greece's attractiveness as a tourist destination to Serbian tourists who often find it less expensive and more comfortable to travel to the Greek coast rather than to western European or north African destinations. From Belgrade Nikola Tesla Airport in Serbia, Air Serbia operates year-round flights to Athens International Airport and Thessaloniki International Airport. Aegean Airlines operates a year-round line from Athens to Belgrade as well.

Coach bus service between Greece and Serbia is paradoxically weak. The only bus line between Serbia and Greece is a low-frequency line operated by Alamanis Tours from Belgrade Bus Station.

On 9 October 2008, Greek Minister of Finance George Alogoskoufis announced that 100 million euro will be donated for the construction the main highway that will connect Serbia and Greece to the rest of Europe, the Corridor X.

Tourism

In Greece
Greece is said to have welcomed the most seasonal tourists from Serbia than any other country. While Athens and Thessaloniki are traditionally popular destinations for Serbs on vacation, tourist charters from Belgrade often channel Serbian travelers to Heraklion, Kos, Zakynthos, and other less densely populated destinations. Unlike English, German, and other foreign tourists, many of whom canceled their vacations in Greece due to protests and economical crisis in the summer of 2010, Serbian tourists broke the record, visiting the country in great numbers. The Serbian President stated, in Athens in June 2010, that this is how Serbia, in a small way, is helping Greek friends during hard times for them.

An estimated 350,000 Serbian citizens visited Greece in 2008. 432,000 Serbians visited in 2009. Many Serbs visit Greece because of the important Serbian heritage found in the country. Some of the cultural and religious sites especially important to Serbs include: the Hilandar monastery in Mount Athos, the Zeitenlik cemetery in Thessaloniki, and the island of Corfu.

In Serbia
In 2015 Serbia was visited by 43,869 Greek tourists, while the number increased on 61,749 in 2016 and on 75,657 in 2018.

Dedications
In most Serbian towns there are several streets named after Greek individuals or regions. In downtown Belgrade there are streets named after Rigas Fereos, Eleftherios Venizelos, Athenian street, Thessaloniki street, Agion Oros street, Macedonian street, Corfu street, to name a few. There are also monuments dedicated to Rigas Fereos and Eleftherios Venizelos in the very center of the Serbian capital.

The second largest Serbian city of Novi Sad is sometimes known as "Serbian Athens". The mountain of Fruška Gora is the site of 17 monasteries and is called the "Serbian Athos".

In the center of Athens, next to Sytagma square, there's a street named after Serbian national hero Karađorđe, and many Greek towns have streets named after Vasos Mavrovouniotis, a Montenegrin Serb who fought in the Greek Revolution. There is a museum in Corfu called the "Serbian house", dedicated to World War I Serbian soldiers.

Sports

Football
Serbia and Greece share a lot of mutual history in contemporary football. In Serbia, the Superleague Greece is closely followed due to the large migration of Serbian expat footballers to Greece, where the league has more money to pay for players' salaries than in Serbia—it is due to this reason that Greek football players are practically nonexistent in Serbia despite Serbian footballers having a large presence in Greek football. Serbian football players have frequently made their career heyday in Greece and have a special place in Greek popular culture. The first Serbian player to ever make a revered name for himself in Greece was Borivoje Đorđević, who represented Panathinaikos in the late 1970s. Arguably, Predrag Đorđević, affectionately called Djole by Olympiakos spectators, was one Serbian footballer to have played in Greece. Otherwise, Vladimir Ivić was the most successful Serbian football player to have played in Greece for a team other than Olympiacos—Ivić had an illustrious career with PAOK, before which he had played briefly for AEK Athens. In 1995, when UEFA suspension on FR Yugoslavia was lifted, the first international game played by a Serb club was precisely a friendly Red Star vs. Olympiacos, in Belgrade.

Ultras Brotherhoods
  
Many Greek and Serbian football clubs share ultra brotherhoods. Serbian FK Partizan and Greek PAOK FC are known "brother-teams" as they both play in black-white uniform, and their biggest enemies in the Greek and Serbian derbies are respectively, Red Star Belgrade and Olympiacos, who both play in red-white jerseys.

The main supporters of Red Star Belgrade are the Delije Ultras, while the Olympiakos supporters are called Gate 7 Ultras, their slogan is "GATE 7 - DELIJE. Orthodox Brothers" and both teams wear the colours red and white. The main supporters of Partizan Belgrade are the Grobari Ultras, while the PAOK FC are called Gate 4 Ultras, their slogan is "Black & White. Same colour - Same faith" and both teams wear the colours black and white. Both groups often display Byzantine Empire and Orthodoxy symbols as icons of their friendship.

Organizations
It is estimated that there are dozens of organizations situated throughout both nations and a smaller amount in the diaspora, but because few of them have established foundations on the internet, it is difficult to keep an accurate tally of how many truly exist. Generally, however, prominent Greek-Serbian organizations have been known to meet with government officials and political figures, religious leaders, and fellow Greek-Serbian groups in order to strengthen mutual relations, sponsor cultural and historical celebrations, establish economic initiatives, and coordinate various humanitarian efforts. Smaller Greek-Serbian organizations generally organize local recreational activities. On 28 July 2006, 18 members of the Serbian parliament took the initiative of establishing a Serbian Greek friendship group, and are looking to increase parliamentary cooperation between both nations.

Events

Belgrade International Book Fair
In 2009, Greece was the country of honour at the 54th International Book Fair in Belgrade, founded 1856. Serbian and Greek writers Dragan Velikic and Tanasis Voltinos opened the event. Serbia was honoured at the 9th Thessaloniki International Book Fair in 2012.

See also 
 Foreign relations of Greece
 Foreign relations of Serbia
 Serbian words of Greek origin
 Accession of Serbia to the European Union
 Greece–Yugoslavia relations

Annotations

Notes

References

Bibliography
 (Public Domain)

External links 

 State organizations
 
 

Other
 
 
 
 Serbian-Greek Friendship Official Site
 Association of Serbs in Greece
 

 
Serbia
Greece